The 51st Rifle Corps was a corps of the Soviet Red Army. It was part of the 22nd Army. It took part in the Great Patriotic War.

Organization 
 98th Rifle Division
 112th Rifle Division
 153rd Rifle Division

Commanders 
 Major General Markov, Akim Markovich (February 1941 - August 1941),
 Major General Avdeenko, Petr Petrovich (July 3, 1943 - May 28, 1944);

Reference 

Rifle corps of the Soviet Union